Louisiana State Newspapers, Inc. is a privately held chain of 23 local newspapers in the state of Louisiana, mostly in the Acadiana region. It is based in Lafayette and is the largest newspaper chain by number of publications in the state.

The chain began in 1963, when Braxton "B.I." Moody III purchased the The Rayne Acadian-Tribune and The Church Point News for $100,000. The company was incorporated as Louisiana State Newspapers in 1973.

The company operates combined news websites in the parishes where it has more than one newspaper: Acadia Parish, Avoyelles Parish, Evangeline Parish, St. Mary Parish, and Vermilion Parish.

Newspapers
 Abbeville Meridional 
 Acadian Press 
 The Basile Weekly 
 The Bayou-Pioneer  
 The Bunkie Record 
 The Caldwell Watchman 
 The Church Point News 
 The Crowley Post-Signal 
 The Delhi Dispatch 
 The Eunice News 
 Gueydan Journal 
 The Kaplan Herald 
 The Kinder Courier News 
 The Marksville Weekly News 
 Morgan City Review 
 St. Mary and Franklin Banner-Tribune 
 The Oakdale Journal 
 The Rayne Acadian-Tribune 
 The Richland Beacon-News 
 Teche News 
 The Tensas Gazette 
 The West Carroll Gazette 
 Ville Platte Gazette

References

Companies based in Lafayette, Louisiana
Newspaper companies of the United States
Mass media companies of the United States
Companies based in Louisiana
Publishing companies established in 1963